Kläsener is a German surname. Notable people with the surname include:

Thomas Kläsener (born 1976), German footballer
Wolfgang Kläsener (born 1962), German church musician, choral conductor, and academic lecturer

See also
Klusener
Cluysenaar

German-language surnames